Bair is a surname. Notable people with the surname include:
Gregory W. Bair, II (born 1980) American lawyer
Brandon Bair (born 1984), American football player
Charles M. Bair (1857–1943), American businessman
Dale Bair, United States Marine Corps officer
Deirdre Bair, American writer
Doug Bair (born 1949), American baseball player
Donald Bair, American politician
Hilbert Bair (1894–1985), American World War I flying ace
Margaret H. Bair, United States Air Force general
Michael Bair, American comic book artist
Myrna L. Bair (born 1940), American educator and politician
RaNae Bair (born 1943), American javelin thrower
Sheila Bair (born 1954), American businesswoman
Steve Bair (born 1958), American politician